Spanky McFarland (1928–1993) was an American actor, member of Our Gang.

Spanky McFarland may also refer to:
Elaine "Spanky" McFarlane, lead singer of the band Spanky and Our Gang
Spanky McFarland (baseball) (born 1954), American college baseball coach at James Madison University